Ramhurst is an unincorporated community in Murray County, Georgia, United States.

Ramhurst was first called "Ramsey", after A. K. Ramsey, the proprietor of a local gristmill and country store.

References

Unincorporated communities in Murray County, Georgia
Unincorporated communities in Georgia (U.S. state)